Elkhart Township is a township in Polk County, Iowa, United States.

History
Elkhart Township was organized in 1851. It was named by a citizen who hailed from Elkhart County, Indiana.

References

Townships in Polk County, Iowa
Townships in Iowa
1851 establishments in Iowa
Populated places established in 1851